"Nothin' But the Cavi Hit" is a single by Mack 10 and Tha Dogg Pound from the Rhyme & Reason soundtrack. It was produced by a Dogg Pound member, Dat Nigga Daz and Master P's "Is There a Heaven 4 a Gangsta?" served as the single's B-Side.

The song was a top-40 hit, reaching No. 38 on the Billboard Hot 100, becoming Tha Dogg Pound's only single to crack the top-40 and the first of two for Mack 10. In addition to the Rhyme & Reason soundtrack, "Nothin' But the Cavi Hit" has also appeared on several compilations, including The N.W.A Legacy, Vol. 1: 1988–1998, Foe Life: The Best of Mack 10 and The West Coast Blueprint.

The single was featured in the 2013 video game Grand Theft Auto V on the radio station West Coast Classics

Single track listing

A-Side
"Nothin' But the Cavi Hit" (Original Xplicit)- 4:03
"Nothin' But the Cavi Hit" (Original Clean)- 4:03
"Nothin' But the Cavi Hit" (Original Instrumental)- 4:04
"Nothin' But the Cavi Hit" (Remix Instrumental)- 3:51

B-Side
"Is There a Heaven 4 a Gangsta?" (Xplicit)- 4:52
"Is There a Heaven 4 a Gangsta?" (Clean)- 4:19
"Is There a Heaven 4 a Gangsta?" (Instrumental)- 5:46

Charts

Weekly charts

References

1996 singles
Mack 10 songs
Tha Dogg Pound songs
G-funk songs
Songs written by Mack 10
Priority Records singles
1996 songs
Songs written by Daz Dillinger
Songs written by Kurupt